Eric M. Klinenberg (born November 14, 1970) is an American sociologist and a scholar of urban studies, culture, and media. He is currently Helen Gould Shepard Professor in Social Science and Director of the Institute for Public Knowledge at New York University. Klinenberg is best known for his contributions as a public sociologist.

Biography

Klinenberg was born in Chicago to a family of Czech-Jewish origin. He attended the Francis W. Parker School and later earned a bachelor of arts degree from Brown University (1993), followed by a master's degree (1997) and  PhD (2000) from the University of California, Berkeley. He is currently Professor of Sociology, Public Policy, and Media, Culture, and Communication at New York University, as well as the editor of the journal Public Culture. In 2012, Klinenberg became the director of the Institute for Public Knowledge at New York University.  In 2013, he was appointed research director of the Rebuild by Design competition.

Publications
Klinenberg's first book, Heat Wave: A Social Autopsy of Disaster in Chicago, was published by the University of Chicago Press in 2002. The book is an account and analysis of the 1995 Chicago heat wave. The book won several scholarly prizes, including the American Sociological Association Robert Park Book Award, the Urban Affairs Association best book award, the British Sociological Association book prize, the Mirra Komarovsky Book Prize, and honorable mention for the C Wright Mills Award, and was a Favorite Book selection by the Chicago Tribune. A theatrical adaptation of the book premiered in Chicago in 2008.

His second book, Fighting for Air: The Battle to Control America’s Media, was called "politically passionate and intellectually serious,", "a must-read for those who wonder what happened to good radio, accurate reporting and autonomous public interest".

His third book, Going Solo: The Extraordinary Rise and Surprising Appeal of Living Alone, was published in February 2012 by Penguin Press. Going Solo has been translated into several languages, including Chinese, Japanese, Korean, Russian, Turkish, and Hungarian, and has generated widespread debate. In a cover story, Time magazine featured Going Solo as "the number one idea that is changing our lives."

In 2013, Klinenberg wrote an influential article in the New Yorker on Hurricane Sandy and climate change adaptation, in which he explained the role of social infrastructure in protecting cities and communities.

Klinenberg co-wrote a book about romance with comedian Aziz Ansari, Modern Romance: An Investigation, published in June 2015.

In 2018, Klinenberg published a book on the role of social infrastructure in American culture titled Palaces for the People: How Social Infrastructure Can Help Fight Inequality, Polarization, and the Decline of Civic Life. Klinenberg analyzes the role of public spaces such as libraries, parks, gardens, and universities among other investments help to strengthen and heal communities and build social capital.

In addition to his books and scholarly articles, Klinenberg has contributed to The New York Times Magazine, Rolling Stone, The London Review of Books, The Nation, The Washington Post, Mother Jones, The Guardian, Le Monde diplomatique, Slate, Playboy, the radio program This American Life  and the television program Real Time with Bill Maher.

Select bibliography

Books

Klinenberg, Eric (2018). Palaces for the People: How Social Infrastructure can Help Fight Inequality, Polarization, and the Decline of Civic Life. Crown Publishing Group.

Essays and journalism

Klinenberg, Eric (September 8, 2018). "To Restore Civil Society, Start With the Library". New York Times.

Notes

External links
Official website
This American Life
''Heat Wave'' book interview

1970 births
American people of Bohemian descent
American people of Czech-Jewish descent
American sociologists
Brown University alumni
Jewish American social scientists
Jewish sociologists
New York University faculty
Living people
The New Yorker people
University of California, Berkeley alumni
Writers from Chicago
21st-century American Jews

Francis W. Parker School (Chicago) alumni